Austria competed at the 2020 Summer Paralympics in Tokyo, Japan, from 24 August to 5 September 2021.

Medalists

Competitors
Source:

Athletics 

Men's track

Men's field

Women's field

Cycling 

Walter Ablinger, Ernst Bachmaier, Elisabeth Egger, Alexander Gritsch, Yvonne Marzinke have all qualified to compete.

Road

Men's road

Women's road

Track

Women's track

Equestrian 

Austria sent four riders after qualified including: Bernd Brugger, Pepo Puch, Julia Sciancalepore and Valentina Strobl.

Paracanoeing 

Markus Swoboda has qualified to compete.

Paratriathlon 

Florian Brungraber and former sprinter Günther Matzinger have qualified to compete.

Swimming 

Andreas Ernhofer, Janina Falk, Andreas Onea have qualified to compete.

Men

Women

Table tennis

Austria entered one athletes into the table tennis competition at the games. Krisztian Gardos qualified via World Ranking allocation.

Men

Wheelchair tennis

Austria qualified four player entries for wheelchair tennis. Three players qualified through the world rankings, and the other qualified under the bipartite commission invitation allocation quota.

See also 
Austria at the Paralympics
Austria at the 2020 Summer Olympics

References 

Nations at the 2020 Summer Paralympics
2020
2021 in Austrian sport